Timothy Charles Buckley III (February 14, 1947 – June 29, 1975) was an American musician. His music and style changed considerably through the years. Buckley began his career based in folk music, but his subsequent albums experimented with jazz, psychedelia, funk, soul, the avant-garde, and an evolving voice-as-instrument sound. He died at the age of 28 from a heroin and morphine overdose, leaving behind sons Taylor and Jeff.

Early life and career 
Tim Buckley was born in Washington, D.C. on Valentine's Day, February 14, 1947, to Elaine (née Scalia), an Italian American, and Timothy Charles Buckley Jr., a decorated World War II veteran and son of Irish immigrants from Cork. At five years old, Buckley began listening to his mother's progressive jazz recordings, particularly Miles Davis.

Buckley's musical life began after his family moved to Bell Gardens in southern California in 1956. His grandmother introduced him to the work of Bessie Smith and Billie Holiday, his mother to Frank Sinatra and Judy Garland and his father to the country music of Hank Williams and Johnny Cash. When the folk music revolution came around in the early 1960s, Buckley taught himself the banjo at age 13, and with several friends formed a folk group inspired by the Kingston Trio that played local high school events.

During high school, Buckley was elected to class offices, played on the baseball team and quarterbacked the football team. During a football game, he broke two fingers on his left hand, permanently damaging them. He said that the injury prevented him from playing barre chords. This disability may have led to his use of extended chords, many of which don't require barres.

Buckley attended Loara High School in Anaheim, California. He cut classes regularly and quit football, focusing most of his attention on music. He befriended Larry Beckett, his future lyricist, and Jim Fielder, a bass player with whom he formed two musical groups, the Bohemians, who initially played popular music, and the Harlequin 3, a folk group which regularly incorporated spoken word and beat poetry into their gigs.

Buckley and lyricist/friend Beckett wrote dozens of songs, some that appeared on Tim's debut album, Tim Buckley. "Buzzin' Fly" was written during this period and was featured on Happy Sad, his 1969 LP.

Buckley's college career at Fullerton College lasted two weeks in 1965. After dropping out of college, Buckley dedicated himself fully to music and playing L.A. folk clubs. During the summer of 1965, he played regularly at a club co-founded by Dan Gordon. He played Orange County coffeehouses such as the White Room in Buena Park and the Monday-night hootenannies at the Los Angeles Troubadour. That year, Cheetah magazine deemed Buckley one of "The Orange County Three", along with Steve Noonan and Jackson Browne.

In February 1966, following a gig at It's Boss, the Mothers of Invention's drummer Jimmy Carl Black recommended Buckley to the Mothers' manager, Herb Cohen. Cohen saw potential in Tim and landed him an extended gig at the Night Owl Cafe in Greenwich Village at West 3rd and MacDougal. Buckley's girlfriend, Jainie Goldstein, drove him to New York. While living in the Bowery with Jainie, Buckley ran into Lee Underwood and asked him to play guitar for him. The two became lifelong friends and collaborators.

Under Cohen's management, Buckley recorded a six-song demo acetate disc which he sent to Elektra records owner Jac Holzman, who offered him a recording contract.

Folk rock 
In August 1966, Buckley recorded his self-titled debut album in three days in Los Angeles. He was often unhappy with his albums after they were recorded and described his debut album as "like Disneyland". The record featured Buckley and a band of Underwood and Orange County friends. Underwood's mix of jazz and country improvisation on a Telecaster guitar became a distinctive part of Buckley's early sound. Jac Holzman and Paul Rothchild's production and Jack Nitzsche's string arrangements cemented the record's mid-'60s sound.

The album's folk-rock style was typical of the time, although many people, including Underwood, felt the strings by Nitzsche "did not enhance its musical quality." Critics took note of Buckley's distinctive voice and tuneful compositions.

Underwood considered the record to be "a first effort, naive, stiff, quaky and innocent [but] a ticket into the marketplace". Holzman expressed similar sentiments and thought Buckley wasn't comfortable in his own musical skin. Larry Beckett suggested the band's desire to please audiences held it back.

Elektra released two singles promoting the debut album, "Wings" with "Grief in My Soul" as the B-side, and "Aren't You the Girl"/"Strange Street Affair Under Blue." Buckley followed with "Once Upon a Time" and "Lady Give Me Your Key", which were not well regarded but showed potential. Elektra decided not to release the songs as singles, and the songs remained in Elektra's record vaults. Rhino Records was unable to find "Lady Give Me Your Key" to include on its Morning Glory: The Tim Buckley Anthology, but the song was the title track on Light in the Attic Records' 2017 collection of the previously unissued 1967 acoustic sessions. "Once Upon A Time" surfaced on Rhino's Where The Action Is 1965–68 Los Angeles anthology in 2009.

Goodbye and Hello, released in 1967, featured late 1960s-style poetry and songs in different timings, and was an ambitious release for the 20-year-old Buckley. Reflecting the confidence Elektra had in Buckley and group, they were given free rein on the content of the album. Beckett continued as lyricist and the album consisted of Buckley originals and Beckett–Buckley collaborations. Critics noted the improved lyrical and melodic qualities of Buckley's music. Buckley's voice had developed since his last release and the press appreciated both his lower register and falsetto in equal measure.

The subject of the album distinguished it from its predecessor. Beckett addressed the psychological nature of war in "No Man Can Find the War", and Underwood welcomed Buckley's entry into darker territory with "Pleasant Street". "I Never Asked to Be Your Mountain" represented a confessional lyric to his estranged wife and child, while the mix of introspective folk songs and political-themed content attracted folk fans and anti-war audiences. Holzman had faith in Buckley and rented advertising space for the musician on the Sunset Strip, an unusual step for a solo act. Buckley distanced himself from comparisons to Bob Dylan, expressing an apathy toward Dylan and his work. While Goodbye and Hello did not make Buckley a star, it performed better in the charts than his previous effort, peaking at No. 171.

Buckley's higher profile led to his album The Best of Tim Buckley being used as a soundtrack to the 1969 film Changes. Buckley performed "Song to the Siren" on the final episode of The Monkees. Buckley was wary of the press and often avoided interviews. After a slot on The Tonight Show, Buckley was standoffish and insulting toward Johnny Carson, and on another television appearance refused to lip sync to "Pleasant Street".

After Beckett was drafted into the Army, Buckley developed his own style, and described the jazz/blues-rock with which he was associated as "white thievery and an emotional sham." Drawing inspiration from jazz greats such as Charles Mingus, Thelonious Monk, Roland Kirk, and vocalist Leon Thomas, Buckley's sound became different from previous recordings.

Later that year, he recorded Happy Sad, which reflected folk and jazz influences and would be his best-charting album, peaking at No. 81.

Middle period 
During 1969, Buckley began to write and record material for three albums, Blue Afternoon, Lorca, and Starsailor. Inspired by the singing of avant-garde musician Cathy Berberian, he integrated the ideas of composers such as Luciano Berio and Iannis Xenakis in an avant-garde rock genre. Buckley selected eight songs for Blue Afternoon, an album similar to Happy Sad in style. In a 1977 article for DownBeat magazine, Lee Underwood wrote that Buckley's heart was not in Blue Afternoon and that the album was a perfunctory response to please his business partners.

While Buckley's music never sold well, his following releases did indeed chart. Lorca alienated his folk base, while Blue Afternoon was criticized as boring and tepid, and "[not] even good sulking music." Blue Afternoon was Buckley's last album to chart on Billboard, reaching No. 192. Following the albums, Buckley began to focus on what he felt to be his masterpiece, Starsailor.

Starsailor contained free jazz textures under Buckley's most extreme vocal performance, ranging from high shrieks to deep, soulful baritone. This personal album included the more accessible "Song to the Siren", a song which has since been covered by This Mortal Coil, Robert Plant, John Frusciante, Bryan Ferry and Brendan Perry. The album was a critical and commercial failure.

Unable to produce his music and almost broke, Buckley turned to alcohol and drug binges. He considered acting and completed an unreleased low-budget film entitled Why? (1971). The film was an experimental use of the new medium video tape and was commissioned by Technicolor.

"Sex funk" period 

In 1970, Buckley disbanded his Starsailor ensemble and assembled a new funk band. He cut three albums, Greetings from L.A., Sefronia and Look at the Fool. Buckley had alienated much of his hippie fan base with his previous two albums, and his sexually frank lyrics ("whip me, spank me") prevented the songs from receiving airplay, although he retained a cult following.

In 1975, Buckley engaged the press regarding a live album comeback. He began performing revamped versions of material drawn from his career, except Starsailor and Lorca, in response to his audience, which he had spurned in the past.

Death 
On June 28, 1975, Buckley completed a short tour with a show in Dallas, playing to a sold-out crowd of 1,800 people. He celebrated the end of the tour with a weekend of drinking with his band and friends. On the night of June 29, he accompanied longtime friend Richard Keeling to his house. At some point, Keeling produced a bag of heroin, some of which Buckley snorted.

Buckley's friends took him home and, seeing his inebriated state, his wife Judy laid him on the living-room floor and questioned his friends as to what had happened. She moved Buckley into bed. When she checked on him later, she found that he was not breathing and had turned blue. Attempts by friends and paramedics to revive him were unsuccessful, and he was pronounced dead on arrival.

The coroner's report stated that Buckley died at 9:42 p.m. on June 29, 1975, from "acute heroin/morphine and ethanol intoxication due to inhalation and ingestion of overdose".

Aftermath 
Buckley's tour manager, Bob Duffy, said Buckley's death was not expected, but "was like watching a movie, and that was its natural ending."

Other friends saw his passing as predictable, if not inevitable. Beckett recalled how Buckley took chances with his life, including dangerous driving, drinking alcohol, taking pills and heroin.

Given the circumstances of his death, police charged Keeling with murder and distribution of heroin. At his hearing on August 14, 1975, Keeling pleaded guilty to involuntary manslaughter and, after failing to complete community service, was sentenced to 120 days in jail and four years' probation.

Buckley died in debt, owning only a guitar and an amplifier. About 200 friends and family attended his funeral at the Wilshire Funeral Home in Santa Monica, including manager Herb Cohen and Lee Underwood. His 8-year-old son, Jeff, had met his father only once, and was not invited to the funeral. Jeff Buckley said not being invited to his father's funeral "gnawed" at him, and prompted him to pay his respects by performing "I Never Asked to Be Your Mountain" in 1991 at a memorial tribute to Buckley in Brooklyn, six years before his own accidental death.

Personal life
During French class in 1964, Buckley met Mary Guibert. Their relationship inspired some of Buckley's music, and provided him time away from his turbulent home life. His father suffered a head injury during the war which, along with a severe work-related injury, was said to have affected his mental balance. Buckley and Guibert married on October 25, 1965. The marriage was tumultuous and when Guibert became pregnant, Buckley found himself neither willing nor able to cope with marriage and fatherhood. The couple divorced in October 1966, about a month before their son, Jeff, was born.

In April 1970, Buckley married Judy Brejot Sutcliffe in Santa Monica, and adopted her son, Taylor Keith Sutcliffe.

Discography

Studio albums
Tim Buckley (Elektra) (1966)
Goodbye and Hello (Elektra) (1967)
Happy Sad (Elektra) (1969)
Blue Afternoon (Straight) (1969)
Lorca (Elektra) (1970)
Starsailor (Straight) (1970)
Greetings from L.A. (Straight/Elektra) (1972)
Sefronia (Bizarre/DiscReet/Edsel/(Get Back)/Manifesto/Real Gone/Straight) (1973)
Look at the Fool (Charter Line/DiscReet/Edsel/Enigma/Get Back/Manifesto (2)/Real Gone/Warner Bros.) (1974)

Live albums 
Dream Letter: Live in London 1968 (Enigma/Manifesto) (1990)
Peel Sessions (Dutch East India/Strange Fruit) (1991/1993)
Live at the Troubadour 1969 (Rhino/Manifesto) (1994)
Honeyman: Live 1973 (Edsel/Manifesto) (1995)
Once I Was (Varese) (1999)
Copenhagen Tapes (Pinnacle Licensed Repertoire) (2000)
Live at the Folklore Center 1967 (Tompkins Square) (2009)
Venice Mating Call (Edsel) (2017)
Greetings From West Hollywood (Edsel) (2017)
Live at the Electric Theatre Co. (Manifesto) (2019)
Bear's Sonic Journals: Merry-Go-Round at the Carousel (Owsley Stanley Foundation) (2021)

Compilations 
The Late Great Tim Buckley (WEA) (1978) - Released in Australia only
The Best of Tim Buckley (Rhino) (1983)
Morning Glory (Band of Joy) (1994)
Works in Progress (Rhino Handmade) (1999)
The Dream Belongs to Me: Rare and Unreleased 1968–1973 (Manifesto) (2001)
Morning Glory: The Tim Buckley Anthology (Rhino) (2001)
Tim Buckley/Goodbye and Hello (Elektra) (2001) - Compilation of first two albums
Take 2: Greetings from L.A./Tim Buckley (Straight/Enigma) (2005) - 2XCD compilation of the two albums
Tim Buckley (Rhino Handmade) (2011) - Handmade 2XCD
Disc One: Both the stereo and mono versions of his debut album
Disc Two: 22 unreleased recordings of Buckley from November 1965 with the Bohemians (12 tracks) and from 1966 with Larry Beckett (10 tracks)
Starsailor: The Anthology (Music Club Deluxe/Rhino) (2011) - 2XCD
Wings: The Complete Singles 1966–1974 (Omnivore Recordings) (2016)

Other releases 
Thin Wires in the Voice (1999) - 120-page booklet with a three-track CD EP included
Tim Buckley: My Fleeting House (MVD Visual) (2007) - DVD of filmed live performances
Tim Buckley: Lady, Give Me Your Key: The Unissued 1967 Solo Acoustic Sessions (Future Days Recordings) (2016) - Demos from Buckley's 1967 sessions

Compilation appearances 
Elektrifying (Elektra) (1968) - "Wings"
Off (Elektra) (1968) - "Song Slowly Sung"
Select Elektra (Elektra) (1968) - "Morning Glory"
Elektra's Best, Volume 1 2XLP (Elektra) (1969) - "Morning Glory"
Zapped (Bizarre) (1970) - "I Must Have Been Blind"
The Big Ball 2XLP (Warner Bros.) (1970) - "Happy Time"
Alternatives (Warner Bros.) (1970) - "Happy Time"
Garden Of Delights 2XLP (Elektra) (1971) - "Wings"
The First Family Of New Rock 2XLP (Atlantic/Exulta/Warner Bros./Reprise Records) - "I Had A Talk With My Woman"
Days Of Wine And Vinyl 2XLP (Warner Bros.) (1972) "Move With Me"
Display Case 2XLP (Warner Bros.) (1972) - "Move With Me", "Sweet Surrender"
The First Family Of New Rock 2XLP (Warner Bros. (France)) (1972) - "Pleasant Street"
All Singing-All Talking-All Rocking 2XLP (Warner Bros.) (1973) - "Sally Go Round The Rose"
Die Grosen Amerikanischen Liedermacher (Warner Bros./Stern Musik) (1974) - "Sally Go Round The Rose"
The Rock Revelation 3XLP (The Sunday Times Magazine) (1975) - "Dolphins"
Musikladen Jazz Rock Humor 3XLP (Warner Bros./Atlantic) (1975) - "Wanda Lou"
Litera Luisterplaat (Warner Bros.) (1976) - "The King's Chair", "Serfonia"
Elektrock 4XLP/4xCass/Box (Elecktra) (1985) "Aren't You The Girl". "Strange Street Affair Under Blue", "I Can't Hear You", "No Man Can Feel The War", "Pleasant Street", "Dream Letter", "Morning Glory"
The Psychodelic Years 3XCD (Knight Records) (1990) - "Buzzin' Fly"
The Psychodelic Years 1966-1969 (American Album Classics) (Knight) (1990) - "Buzzin' Fly"
Before The Fall '67-'77 -The Peel Sessions (Strange Fruit) (1991) - "Once I Was"
Troubadours Of The Folk Era Vol. 2 (Rhino/Warner Special Products) (1992) - "Once I Was"
West Coast Rock (Castle) (1992) - "More With Me"
Peace and Love 76-75, Les Annees Plasantes (Delabel) (1993) - "Sweet Surrender"
Microdelia (Diablo) (1994) - "Driftin' (live)"
Starship-Viaggio Nella Musica Psychodelia (Mercury) (1995) - "Hallucinations"
Step Right Up (The Songs of Tom Waits) (Manifesto) (1995) - "Martha"
The Demon Bible According To Tower, Book One (Demon) (1995) - "Dolphins"
18 Free And Easy Hits From The 70's (JCI/Warner Special Products) (1995) - "Buzzin' Fly"
White Roots (From American Folk to Country Rock) (BMG Music/RCA) (1996) - "Buzzin' Fly"
Best of American Rock (CNR) (1996) - "Honey Man"
Psychodelic Roses (Warner Music Greece) (1996) - "I Can't See You"
Peace Love & Music (Starbucks 25th Anniversary Anthology) (Starbucks/AEI) (1996) -"Pleasant Street"
Psychodelic Perceptions (Temple) (1996) - "Hallucinations"
Crooning On Venus Ocean Of Sound 2 2XCD (Virgin) (1996) - "Star Sailor"
Der Nachtfalke (Columbia/Sony) (1997) - "Sweet Surrender"
Unknown Pleasures (Rare And Classic Tracks From The Archives of Demon Records) (Uncut (2)) (1998) - "Dolphins" - given away free with a UK music and film magazine
Discover America's Hearts & Spirits Vol. 5 (WEA) (1998) - "I Can't See You", "Carnival Song"
Generations of Folk, Vol. Four-The Troubadours (Vanguard) (1998) - "Sing A Song For You"
Real Fidelity-The Liberating Sound Of Division One (Vanguard) (2001) - "Mexicali Voodoo"
Cafe Apres-Midi~Roux (WEA Japan) (2000) - "Buzzin' Fly"
Peace And Love '60·1967-1 (Fabbri Edition) (2000) - "Morning Glory"
Follow The Music-A Comprehensive Sampler of Elektra's Pre-Rock Era (Elektra) (2000) - "Goodbye and Hello"
Peace & Love '60·1967-5 (Fabbri) (2000) - "Pleasant Street"
Elektra: The first 50 Years 5XCD (Elektra) - "Morning Glory"
American Music (DeAgostini) (2000) - "Morning Glory"
Protest And Poetry (DeAgostini) (2000) - "Pleasant Street"
Peace And Love '60·1967-9 (Fabbri) (2000) - "Goodbye and Hello"
Me Without You (Music From The Motion Picture) (Epic) (2001) - "Strange Peelin'"
Underground Moderna (Nova) (2001) - "Sweet Surrender"
Washington Square Memoirs-The Great Urban Folk Boom 1960-1970 3XCD (Rhino) (2001) - "Once I Was"
RMAT Study Guide (Rhino) (2001) - Morning Glory"
Coast To Coast (DeAgostini) (2001) - "Strange Feelin'"
19-Track Guide To The Month's Best Music (Uncut(2)) (2001) - "Falling Timber"
Simply The Best Songwriters 2XCD (Warner Strategic Marketing) (2002) - "Morning Glory"
Take It Easy 2XCD (Warner Strategic Marketing) (2002) - "Move With Me"
Pure Genius 2XCD (Warner Strategic Marketing United Kingdom) (2002) - "Morning Glory"
Songs 2 (The Best Of The Singer/Songwriters) 2XCD (Warner Strategic Marketing The Netherlands) - "Morning Glory"
100% Classic Pop-40 Grand Artistas En 2Cd's 2XCD (Warner Strategis Markets) (20020 - "Morning Glory"
Simply The Best Songwriters 2 2XCD (Warner Strategic Marketing) (2002) - "Song For The Siren"
Pure Genius Volume 2 (Warner Strategic Marketing United Kingdom) (2002) - "Song For The Siren"
Songwriter 2XCD (Sony Music|Sony Music TV) (2002) - "Song For The Siren"
Songs (The Best Of The Singer/Songwriters) 2XCD (RTL/Warner Strategic Marketing) (2002) - "Morning Glory"
Songs 2 Best Of West Coast 2XCD (Warner Music|Warner Music Group Germany) (2002) - "Move With Me"
Songs 3 (Best Of Singer/Songwriters) 2XCD (Warner Strategic Marketing|Sat.1) (2002) - "Song To The Siren"
Acoustic 2 2XCD (Echo)/V2) (2002) - "Once I Was"
Simply The Best Songwriters 2 2XCD (Warner Strategic Marketing) (2002) - "Song Of The Siren"
Folk Heros 2XCD (EMI) (2003) - "Morning Glory"
Singer And Singwriters-The Folk Years 2XCD (Time Life|Time Life Music) (2003) - "Morning Glory", "Happy Time"
Strange Currencies (Uncut (2)) (2003) - "Dolphins (Live)"
Simply The Best Songwriters 2 2XCD (Warner Strategic Marketing) (2003) -"Morning Glory"
Singer And Songwriters-Mavericks 2XCD (Time Life Music) (2003) - "Once I Was"
Rokkland 2003 2XCD (Skifan) (2003) - "Song For The Siren"
50 And De Rock-15 Tresors Des Annees (Les Inrockuptibles) (2004) - "Morning Glory"
Reelin" In The Years 2XCD (Universal/Warner Strategic Marketing) (2004) - "Move With Me"
L'odyssee Du Rock 4XCD (Sony Music|Sony Music Media) (2004) - "Morning Glory"
The Peace and Love Generation 6XCD (Warner) ( 2004) - "Buzzin' Fly"
10 Corso Como-Love 3 3XCD (Irma Records) (2004) - "Song For The Siren" 
Accoustic 04 2XCD (Echo/V2) (2004) - "Dolphins"
Sin City (14 L.A. Rock Classics) (Uncut (2)) (2004) - "Chase The Blues Away"
The Jack Nitzsche Story (Hearing Is Believing 1962-1979) (Ace) (2005) - "It Happens Every Time"
John Peel-A Tribute 2XCD (Warner Strategic Marketing) (2005) - "Song To The Siren"
Gloomy Afternoon (The Music Of Melancholy) (EmArcy/Universal) (2005) - "Love From Room 109 At The Islander"
Lammas Night Laments Volume 9 CDr (The Unbroken Circle) (2005) - "Song For The Siren (Demo)"
Acoustic Rock Volume 2 (Crimson) (2005) - "Once I Was (Live In London 1968)"
1967 (Ein Jahr Und Seine 20 songs) (Suddentsche Zeitung) (2005) - "Morning Glory"
Forever Changing-The Golden Age Of Elektra Records 1963-1973 5XCD (Rhino) (2006) "Wings", "Once I Was", "Sing A Song", "Wayfaring Stranger"
Selections From...Forever Changing-The Golden Ave Of Elektra Records 1963-1973 (Rhino) (2006) - "Sing A Song For You"
25 Ans Radio Vova (Nova Records|Nova)
Candy Original Soundtrack (Inertia)/(iNSYNC music) (2006) - "Song To The Siren"
Alternative Acoustic 2XCD (Magic Club Deluxe) (2006) - "Once I Was"
Classics From John Peel's All-Time Festive Fifty (Universal) (2006) - "Song To the Siren"
The Old Grey Whistle Test-The Complete Collection 3XDVD (BBC Worldwide) (2006) - "Dolphins"
Four Decades Of Folk Rock 4XCD Box Set (Time Life/(Sony BMG)/Rhino/UMG) (2007) -"I Never Asked To Be Your Mountain"
Wild World 2XCD (Time Life Music) (2007) - "Morning Glory", "Happy Times"
100 Hits 60s 5XCD (100 Hits/Demon) (2007) - "I Can't See You"
Between The Lines Vol. 1 2XCD (EMS) (2007) - "Pleasant Street"
100 Hits 70s 5XCD (100 Hits/Demon) (2007) - "Move With Me"
California Dreaming 2XCD (Warner Music TV) (2007) - "Sweet Surrender"
Solid Kult Volume 1 (Universal Music GmbH, Austria) (2007) - "Sweet Surrender"
Revolutions In Sound: Warner Bros. Records The First Fifty Years M/Stick//MP3 (Warner Bros.) (2006) - "Song To The Siren"
A Monstrous Psychedelic Bubble Vol. 1-Cosmic Space Music 2XCD (Platypus) (2008) - "I Never Asked To Be Your Mountain"
From The Coffee House (Starbucks Entertainment/Rhino) (2008) - "Song To The Siren (Demo version)" - "Song To The Siren"
Revoltes-La Musique Contestataire En 50 Chansons (Les Inrockuptibles) (2008) - "No Man Can Find The War"
Where The Action Is! (Los Angeles Nuggets: 1965-1968) 4XCD (Rhino) (2008) - "Once Upon A Time"
The Ultimate Collection-Slow Rock 3XCD (EMI) (2009) - "Song To The Siren"
Okio-Mosaican (Warner) (2009) - "Phantasmagoria In Two"
Lost & Found-Songs We Shouldn't Forget (USM) (2010) - "Sing A Song For You"
Les Blockhuis Presents The Sound Of The West Coast 1965-1979 4XCD (Ultgeverij Ambo/Universal Music/Rhino) 4XCD (2010) - "Sing A Song For You"
100 Hits Sixties Pop 5XCD (100 Hits) (2010) - "I Can't See You", "Buzzin' Fly"
Le Coffret Ideal Rock Psyche 4XCD (Warner Music France) (2010) - "Song For Janie"
L'album Folk 2XCD (Warner Music France) (2010) - "Morning Glory"
60s Hits 2XCD (Crimson) (2010) - "I Can't See You"
Dimitris Papaspyropoulous-Long Missed Heros 2XCD (The Spicy Effect)- "Make It Right"
Journey To Love (Rare & Early Elektra Classics) (Mojo) (2010) - "Morning Glory"
Robert Plant's Jukebox (The Music That Inspired The Man) (Chrome Dreams) (2011) - "Song To The Siren"
The Old Grey Whistle Test (Rhino) (2011) - "Happy Time"
The Sixties 3XCD (Crimson/Rhino) (2011) - "I Can't See You", "Buzzin' Fly"
Classic Americana 2XCD (Warner Music Archives) (2012) - "Song To The Siren"
70s The Collection 3XCD/Box (Rhino) (2012) - "Move With Me"
Classic Americana 3 (Warner Music Australia) (2013) - "Get On Top"
Sonar 1000 Volume 3 3XCD (Parlophone) (2013) - "Sweet Surrender"
Songs We Shouldn't Forget Collected 2XCD/Box (Universal) (2013) - "Sing A Song For You"
Coffret 60 Ans De Musique 2XCD (FNAC/Les Inrockuptibles) (2014) - "Move With Me"
Original Americana 2XCD (Rhino UK) (2014) - "Move With Me"
Greenwich Village In The '60s-Beginnings & Branches Of The New York Folk Revival 2XCD (Festival) (2014) - "Aren't You The Girl"
Original Seventies 2XCD (Rhino) (2014) - "Happy TimeT"
Massive Hits-Sixties 3XCD (Rhino UK) (2014) - "Phantasmagoria In Two"
Troubadours (Folk And The Roots Of American Music) Part 4 3XCD (Bear Family) (2014) - "Once I Was"
Bobby Gillespie Presents Sunday Mornin' Comin' Down (Ace) (2015) - "Once I Was"
The Best Ever-Time To Relax 2XCD (Rhino UK) (2015) - "Wings"
The Best Ever Sixties 2XCD (Rhino) (2015) - "Phantasmagoria In Two"
The Best Ever Acoustic 2XCD (Rhino) "Song To The Siren (Take 7)"
R-R-Real Rock And Roll-Volume Sweet 16 And Never Been... CDr (Teenage Wasteland) (2016) - "Phantasmagoria In Two"
60 Hits Of The...60s 3XCD (Rhino) (2016) - "Phantasmagoria In Two"
60s-The Collection 3XCD (Rhino UK) (2016) - "Phantasmagoria In Two"
American Classics 3XCD (Rhino) (2016) - "Song To The Siren"
Summer Of Love 2XCD (Rhino) (2017) - "Morning Glory"
Acoustic-The Ultimate Acoustic Anthems 3XCD (Rhino UK) (2019) - "Song To The Siren (Take 7)"
Coffret FIP Vol. 3 5XCD (Wagram) (2017) - "Happy Time"
Classic Acoustic 3XCD (UMC/Rhino UK/Spectrum) (2017) - "Once I Was"
Coming Into Los Angeles (A Taste Of West Coast) (Own Label) (2017) - "Song To The Siren"
Smooth 70s 3XCD (Rhino) (2017) - "Song To The Siren"
Chilled 70s 3XCD (Ministry of Sound/Sony)  (2018) - "Song To The Siren"
Where The Action Is! (Los Angeles Nuggets) 2XLP (Rhino) (2019) - "Once I Was"
Ultimate Sixties (The Classics) 5XCD (Union Square) (2019) - "Once Upon A Time"
Cosmic Cratedigging (15 Tracks Chosen Exclusively For Uncut From The Vaults Of Light In The Attic Records) (Uncut (2)/Light In The Attic) (2020) - "I Never Asked To Be Your Mountain"
5 Ans De FIP 10XLP ([PIAS] Le Label/FIP) (2021) - "Song To The Siren"
Heros And Villians 3XCD Box (The Sound Of Los Angeles 1965–68) (Grapefruit/Grapefruit USA) (2022) - "Carnival Song"
David Hapworth-Deep 70s 4XCD (Underrated Cuts From A Misunderstood Decade) (Edsel) (2022) - "Move With Me"

Books 
Once He Was: the Tim Buckley Story (1997) Paul Barrera
Dream Brother: The Lives and Music of Jeff and Tim Buckley (2001) David Browne
Blue Melody: Tim Buckley Remembered (2002) Lee Underwood
Voci da una nuvola – Il segreto di Nick Drake e Tim Buckley (2015) Giampiero La Valle

Tribute albums 
Sing a Song for You: Tribute to Tim Buckley (Manifesto) (2000)
Dream Brother: The Songs of Tim and Jeff Buckley (Full Time Hobby/Rykodisc) (2005)

References and notes

External links 
The Tim Buckley Archives – Official
Tim Buckley Music
TimBuckley.com
Lee Underwood's official site
Rhino Entertainment – Tim Buckley

1947 births
1975 deaths
American rock songwriters
American rock singers
American folk singers
American male singer-songwriters
American folk guitarists
Musicians from Anaheim, California
Deaths by heroin overdose in California
American people of Italian descent
American people of Irish descent
Elektra Records artists
People from Amsterdam, New York
20th-century American singers
American rock guitarists
American acoustic guitarists
American male guitarists
Drug-related deaths in California
Alcohol-related deaths in California
20th-century American guitarists
Singer-songwriters from New York (state)
Singer-songwriters from California
People from Bell Gardens, California
Guitarists from California
Guitarists from Washington, D.C.
Guitarists from New York (state)
20th-century American male singers
Restless Records artists
Singer-songwriters from Washington, D.C.